Thomas Blenkarn Liddle (22 April 1921 – 28 October 1994) was an English professional footballer who made one appearance in the Football League for Bournemouth & Boscombe Athletic as a full back.

References 

English Football League players
Clapton Orient F.C. wartime guest players
English footballers
Association football fullbacks
1921 births
1994 deaths
Footballers from County Durham
Hartlepool United F.C. players
AFC Bournemouth players
Yeovil Town F.C. players